The Buchan River is a perennial river of the Snowy River catchment, located in the Alpine region of the Australian state of Victoria.

Course and features
The river is joined by the Murrindal River and eight minor tributaries, before reaching its confluence with the Snowy River near Lucas Point in the Shire of East Gippsland. The river descends  over its  course.

At Buchan, the river is traversed by Gelantipy Road, and a little further to the east, the Buchan Orbost Road.

Etymology
The name Buchan is thought to be taken from the Aboriginal phrase bukkan bukkan or bukkan mungie, referring to bags made from grass.

History

Aboriginal history
The traditional custodians of the land surrounding the upper reaches of the Buchan River are the Australian Aboriginal Bidawal and Nindi-Ngudjam Ngarigu Monero peoples; while in its lower reaches, the Gunaikurnai people identify the land surrounding Buchan as their traditional country.

At Cloggs Cave near Buchan, evidence has been found of Aboriginal occupation in prehistoric times.

European history
Pastoralists first entered the area surrounding the town of Buchan in the late 1830s. Buchan Station, taken up in the 1840s, had a succession of owners. To the north were the Gelantipy and Black Mountain runs. There were small groups of Aboriginals in the area but their numbers declined rapidly after European settlement. In 1861, Rev. John Bulmer inspected land south of Buchan as a possible site for a mission station. When he moved to Lake Tyers, the remaining Aboriginals accompanied him there. Land settlement began in 1870, with the best land along the river quickly taken up. A township was proclaimed in 1873, taking its name from the station. The Victorian Municipal Directory described the district in 1888.

See also

 Buchan Caves
 List of rivers of Australia

References

External links
 
 
 
 

East Gippsland catchment
Rivers of Gippsland (region)